the 2023 UNAF U-20 Women's Tournament is an international women's youth football tournament held in Sousse, Tunisia. the four national teams involved in the tournament were required to register a squad of up to 23 players, with Players born between 1 January 2003 and 31 December 2007 eligible to compete in the tournament.

Teams

Algeria
The final squad was announced on 3 March 2023.

Head coach: Rachid Aït Mohamed

Egypt
Head coach: Abedelfattah Abbes

Morocco
The final squad was announced on 3 March 2023.

Head coach:  Antony Rimasson

Tunisia
The final squad was announced on 8 March 2023.

Head coach: Samir Landolsi

Player representation

By club
Clubs with 3 or more players represented are listed.

By club nationality

By club federation

References

2023 in women's association football
2023 in youth association football
2023 in Tunisian sport
International association football competitions hosted by Tunisia
UNAF